Dashti Kalateh-ye Sharqi (also Romanized as Dashtī Kalāteh-ye Sharqī; also known as Dasht Kalāteh-ye Sharqī) is a village in Anzan-e Gharbi Rural District, in the Central District of Bandar-e Gaz County, Golestan Province, Iran. At the 2006 census, its population was 666, in 153 families.

References 

Populated places in Bandar-e Gaz County